Knockacorha (in Irish Cnoc A'Chartha, meaning "Hill of the Big Stone") is a townland in County Roscommon. It is bounded on the north by the townland of Macnadille and Turmore, on the east by Turrymartin, south by Ardlavaugh and west by Derrylow.

Townlands of County Roscommon